The 2015 National Hockey League All-Star Game was an exhibition ice hockey game played on January 25, 2015. The game was held in Columbus, Ohio, for the first time, at Nationwide Arena, home of the Columbus Blue Jackets. The team captains were chosen by NHL Hockey Operations: Nick Foligno of the All-Star Game-hosting Blue Jackets served as captain for the home team, and Jonathan Toews of the Chicago Blackhawks served for the away team. Team Toews won the game 17–12, as the teams and players broke a variety of All-Star Game scoring records.

Columbus was originally scheduled to host the All-Star Game on January 27, 2013. The game was postponed two years, first because of the 2012–13 NHL lockout and then due to the league's participation in the 2014 Winter Olympics tournament.

Fan voting 

On January 1, 2015, six players were voted into the All-Star Game over seven weeks of online voting. Five Chicago Blackhawks players were voted in: forwards Patrick Kane and Jonathan Toews, defensemen Duncan Keith and Brent Seabrook and goaltender Corey Crawford. The only player voted in as a member of a different team was forward Zemgus Girgensons of the Buffalo Sabres, who was the most voted overall due to a campaign in his native Latvia.

Rosters
Peter Laviolette of the Nashville Predators and Darryl Sutter of the Los Angeles Kings were named coaches for the game on January 9, 2015. On January 14, 2015, the league announced the captains for the game would be Jonathan Toews and Nick Foligno. Being a player for the hometown Columbus Blue Jackets, Foligno's team was the home team. Drew Doughty and Patrick Kane served as alternate captains for Team Foligno while Ryan Getzlaf and Rick Nash served the same role for Team Toews.

A draft to select teams was held two days prior to the game, on January 23, 2015. The captains and alternate captains from each team sat together and selected players throughout 18 rounds. In past years, the last player picked would receive a new car; during this draft, the final two picks Ryan Nugent-Hopkins and Filip Forsberg were voted onto their teams by online fan voting and as a result, both players received 2015 Honda Accords. The rules during the draft required all goaltenders to have been selected by the end of the 10th round and all defensemen by the end of the 15th.

Rookies

The rookies only competed in the NHL All-Star Skills Competition on Saturday, Jan. 24, with the exception of Ekblad, Forsberg and Gaudreau, who were promoted to the All-Star Game as injury replacements.

Withdrawn

Prior to the draft, seven players withdrew due to injuries. Only six of seven withdrawn players were replaced by the beginning of the All-Star weekend, leaving an uneven number of players to compete in the All-Star Game. Ultimately, it was Team Toews who had one less player after the draft. Although Sidney Crosby originally did not have a replacement named, it was later decided that skills competition rookie Johnny Gaudreau would take his spot in the game. Three withdrawn players were eventually replaced by rookies who were originally slated to only participate in the skills competitions, while four others were replaced by other NHL players assigned to the Game by the league. The day of the game, Tyler Johnson withdrew due to a lower-body injury; although already having been selected to Team Toews, a replacement was not named and the team's roster remained reduced by two players.

Uniforms
For the first All-Star Game in three years, Reebok sought to do something a bit different. Instead of traditional color designs, Reebok chose to incorporate a color they referred to as "elite green" as the primary trim color of their uniforms for this game. The color had been in use on the inside collars of the Reebok Edge jersey, but this marked its first (and, to date, only) use as a visible uniform color. Following on the use of chromed logos in the 2014 NHL Stadium Series, the NHL shields on the front of the All-Star uniforms were also given a chrome treatment, with two stars added inside the NHL shield to represent the two conferences (despite the game not using a conference format).

Game summary

The game was played from 5pm until 8pm, local Eastern Time. It was broadcast nationally in Canada on CBC and in the United States on NBCSN. Locksley, Fall Out Boy and O.A.R. performed before the game and during intermissions one and two, respectively. Columbus Blue Jackets anthem singer Leo Welsh sang a bilingual version of the Canadian national anthem while Jo Dee Messina sang the American national anthem. The referees for the game were Chris Rooney and Chris Lee, while Tony Sericolo and Steve Miller served as linesman.

Team Toews won the game by a score of 17–12, setting a new record for most goals by a team in an All-Star Game, surpassing the previous record of 16 set in the 1993 game by the Wales Conference team. Every skater on the winning team recorded at least one point during the game. The two teams combined for a total of 29 goals, besting the previous record of 26 set in the 2001 game between teams North America and World. Another record broken was the number of second period goals, as the 11 total goals was one higher than the previous record of 10, achieved four times (most recently in 2009). At the end of the game, Ryan Johansen of the hometown Columbus Blue Jackets won the most valuable player award by result of an online fan vote.

New York Islanders captain John Tavares scored four goals, becoming only the sixth player in All-Star game history to score that many in a game, and the first since Dany Heatley in 2003. Jakub Voracek of the Philadelphia Flyers scored six points (three goals and three assists) which tied a record set by Mario Lemieux. A record was also broken for quickest back-to-back goals by Minnesota Wild defenseman Ryan Suter and Flyers' captain Claude Giroux, after they scored eight seconds apart.

Records set 
The following records were set or tied during the game:

 Most goals by a single team: 17, Team Toews (previously 16)
 Most goals scored in total: 29 (previously 26)
 Most goals in a single period: 11 (previously 10)
 Most goals in a single period by one team: 7, Team Toews, 2nd period (tied with Team Wales, 1990, 1st period)
 Most goals by a single player: 4, John Tavares (tied with Wayne Gretzky, Mario Lemieux, Vincent Damphousse, Mike Gartner and Dany Heatley)
 Most points by a single player: 6, Jakub Voracek (tied with Mario Lemieux)
 Fastest back-to-back goals
 Fastest 3 goals scored
 Fastest 4 goals scored

References

External links
2015 NHL Draft official website

National Hockey League All-Star Games
All-Star Game
2015 in sports in Ohio
Sports competitions in Columbus, Ohio
21st century in Columbus, Ohio
January 2015 sports events in the United States
National Hockey League in Ohio
Ice hockey competitions in Ohio